Richard knapt het op  is a 1943 Dutch film directed by Henk van der Linden.

Cast
Werner Tiemans	... 	The cross-eyed
Rinus Bonekamp	... 	Rudolf Roodhaar
Martin Vermegen	... 	Landlord
Dirk Capel	... 	Dirk
Henk van der Linden

External links 
 

1943 films
Dutch black-and-white films
1940s Dutch-language films